Joel Lee Adamson (born July 2, 1971) is an American former professional baseball pitcher. He played for the Florida Marlins,  Milwaukee Brewers and Arizona Diamondbacks of Major League Baseball (MLB).

Career 
Left handed pitcher Joel Adamson, hailing from Lakewood, California, was first drafted in the seventh round in 1990 by the Philadelphia Phillies. After the 1992 season, they traded him to the pre-debut Marlins with Matt Whisenant for Danny Jackson. 
Adamson got called up to the major leagues for the Marlins in 1996, and pitched in nine games. The Marlins traded Adamson to the Brewers for a PTBNL after the season, and Milwaukee eventually sent Ed Collins in his place.  Adamson played a total of  innings for Milwaukee in 1997, and played  five games for the Diamondbacks in 1998.

Adamson was drafted in a Rule 5 Draft by the Boston Red Sox in 1998 from the Oakland Athletics.
He appeared in 44 games for three teams with 11 starts over a short 3-year career from 1996 to 1998. He played nine seasons in the minor leagues with seven different teams with five different MLB affiliations.

References

External links

1971 births
Living people
American expatriate baseball players in Canada
Arizona Diamondbacks players
Baseball players from California
Cerritos Falcons baseball players
Charlotte Knights players
Clearwater Phillies players
Edmonton Trappers players
Florida Marlins players
High Desert Mavericks players
Major League Baseball pitchers
Milwaukee Brewers players
Pawtucket Red Sox players
People from Lakewood, California
Portland Sea Dogs players
Reading Phillies players
Tacoma Rainiers players
Tucson Toros players
Spartanburg Phillies players